The 1937 Fordham Rams football team represented Fordham University during the 1937 college football season. Once again, the Rams' offense dominated with over 100 points scored in the first two games. The defense held every opponent to seven points or less per game, and recorded five shutouts, including top-ranked Pittsburgh and No. 19 ranked North Carolina.  The Rams' went undefeated with a  record and were third in the final AP rankings, only giving up 16 points all season.

For the third consecutive year, Fordham and Pitt played to a scoreless tie. The season's first AP poll was released a few days later, with Pitt third and Fordham ninth; the Panthers finished the season as national champions at

Schedule

References

Fordham
Fordham Rams football seasons
College football undefeated seasons
Fordham Rams football